Wang is the pinyin romanization of the common Chinese surnames  (Wáng) and  (Wāng). It is currently the most common surname in mainland China, as well as the most common surname in the world, with more than 107 million worldwide.

Population and distribution
Wáng is one of the most common surnames in the world and was listed by the People's Republic of China's National Citizen ID Information System as the most common surname in mainland China in April 2007, with 92.88 million bearers and comprising 7.25% of the general population.

A 2018 survey found that there were over 100 million Wang in China, ranking first.

Wáng was also the most common surname in Mainland China in 2019.

A 2013 study found the province with the most people sharing the name was Henan. Overall the name is more prevalent in Northern China. In 2019 it was the most common surname in nearly every northern province or province-level division: Xinjiang, Gansu, Inner Mongolia, Shaanxi, Shanxi, Henan, Hebei, Anhui, Jiangsu, Shandong, Beijing, Tianjin, Liaoning, Jilin, and Heilongjiang, as well as the southern province of Hainan.

It was the 6th most common surname in Taiwan in 2018, comprising 4.10% of the general population.

Ong is the 5th-most-common surname among Chinese Singaporeans and Wang the 6th, although Wong also includes the surname 黃 (Huang in Mandarin). Singaporean Wangs are 78,000 and 1.5% of Singapore's population and 2.5% of Singapore's Chinese population.

There are 143,000 recorded Wangs in the United States, as of 2014. This is a double increase from 2000, when 63,800 Wangs ranked 10th most common amongst Asian Americans and 440th amongst all Americans, respectively. There are 51,000 Wangs in California, 17,000 New York, 10,400 Texas, 5,900 New Jersey, 5,700 Illinois. Californian Wangs rank 55th in state, highest in rank as well by state of any state. Wang and Wong are sometimes interchangeable, as well as other Wang-based surnames so the number could vary.

Wang is a fairly rare surname in South Korea. The year 2000 South Korean Census listed only 23,447 Wangs.

Origins of Wang
Wang  is the Chinese word for "king".

The modern bearers of the name Wang come from many different backgrounds, but there are four principal origins of the modern surname: Zi, Ji, Gui, and the adoption of the name from ethnic groups outside the Han Chinese.

House of Zi
The most ancient family name of Wang was originated from the surname Zi (子). The Chinese legend mentions that near the end of Shang Dynasty, King Zhou of Shang's uncle Bi Gan, Ji Zi, and Wei Zi were called "The Three Kindhearted Men of Shang". King Zhou was violent in his rule, and Bi Gan repeatedly remonstrated to the king regarding his behavior. The king shunned his comments and killed Bi Gan instead. Bi's descendants used Wang as their surname as they are descendants of a prince and were known as "The Bi clan of the Wang family". The Zi clan has existed for about 3100 years through Qin Dynasty to Tang Dynasty and exists today. The Zi clan of Wang lived predominantly in modern-day Henan during these times and developed into the famous Wang family of Ji prefecture.

House of Ji
More Wang were originated from the royal family of Zhou Dynasty. The original surname of the royal family of Zhou Dynasty was Ji (姬). However, many of them have separated out of the family due to the loss of power and land. Because they once belonged to the royal family, they used Wang as their surname. This family of Wang traced its ancestry to Wang Ziqiao.

According to the classical records, after King Wu of Zhou defeated the Shang Dynasty, he established the Western Zhou Dynasty. During the reign of the 21st king, King Ling of Zhou (571 - 545 BCE), the capital was in Chengzhou, which is the present day Luoyang, Henan. A son of King Ling, Wangzi Qiao or Prince Qiao, was reduced to civilian status due to his remonstration to the king. His son Zong Jin remained as a Situ in the palace, and because of the people at the time recognized him as the descendant of the royal family, they called his family the "Wang family".

Another origin is that the surname is from Crown Prince Jin, son of King Ling of Zhou of the Eastern Zhou dynasty. Jin criticized plans to divert the Gu and Luo rivers and was disinherited by his father. His descendants adopted the surname Wang in commemoration of his royal status.

In other cases, the name can also be traced back to Tian He, who usurped the throne of the Qi in 391 BC.  After the annihilation of Qi by Qin in 221 BC, some descendants of nobles of Qi adopted the surname Wang in commemoration of royal ancestry.

Wang was also used as a surname by descendants of royal families in certain other states, like Wei, during the Warring States period.

The surname has also been adopted by some families of minorities like the Ke Yi (可颐) families of the Xianbei during the Northern Wei dynasty.

In some families, this surname is traced back to ancestors who either were endowed with it by an emperor or changed their original surname, claiming royal status.

During the Tang dynasty the Li clan of Zhaojun , the Cui clan of Boling , the Cui clan of Qinghe , the Lu clan of Fanyang , the Zheng clan of Xingyang , the Wang clan of Taiyuan , and the Li clan of Longxi  were the seven noble families between whom marriage was banned by law.  Moriya Mitsuo wrote a history of the Later Han-Tang period of the Taiyuan Wang. Among the strongest families was the Taiyuan Wang. The prohibition on marriage between the clans issued in 659 by the Gaozong Emperor was flouted by the seven families since a woman of the Boling Cui married a member of the Taiyuan Wang, giving birth to the poet Wang Wei. He was the son of Wang Chulian who in turn was the son of Wang Zhou.

The marriages between the families were performed clandestinely after the prohibition was implemented on the seven families by Gaozong. The Zhou dynasty King Ling's son Prince Jin is assumed by most to be the ancestor of the Taiyuan Wang. The Longmen Wang were a cadet line of the Zhou dynasty descended Taiyuan Wang, and Wang Yan and his grandson Wang Tong hailed from his cadet line. Both Buddhist monks and scholars hailed from the Wang family of Taiyuan such as the monk Tanqian. The Wang family of Taiyuan included Wang Huan. Their status as "Seven Great surnames" became known during Gaozong's rule. The Taiyuan Wang family produced Wang Jun who served under Emperor Huai of Jin. A Fuzhou-based section of the Taiyuan Wang produced the Buddhist monk Baizhang.

The surname in other countries

East Asia

Korea

The surname Wang has a Goguryeo origin and was the royal surname of Goryeo dynasty which was founded by Wang Geon. It is said that when Goryeo fell, many changed their surname to Jeon (全) / Jeon (田) / Ok (玉) to avoid severe persecution from the succeeding Joseon Dynasty. The Kaesong Wang lineage traces its ancestry to the Goryeo rulers.

Japan
Ō is a rare Japanese name, mostly held by those of Chinese descent, such as the baseball player Sadaharu Oh (王貞治), also known as Wang Chen-chih.

Southeast Asia

Indonesia
In Indonesia, the surname is often romanized as "Heng", "Bong" or "Ong" for people of Hokkien descent, and more commonly as Ong by Chinese Peranakan. In some cases, the meaning of the names were translated into a name that sounds more like the area where these immigrant families settled in such as the surname Suraja, where in this case raja means king in Indonesian and Javanese and Su- is a common prefix within javanese surnames.

Vietnam 
In Vietnam, the name is rendered Vương (王) meaning King.

Europe

Scandinavia
Wang is also an unrelated surname in Sweden and Norway.  It is a variant spelling of the name Vang which is derived from the Old Norse word vangr, meaning field or meadow.

Germany and Netherlands
Wang is also a surname in the German and Dutch languages. The name is derived from Middle German wang/ Middle Dutch waenge, which is literally "cheek". However, in southern German, its meaning, "grassy slope" or "field of grass", is similar to the Scandinavian surname.

Notable people surnamed Wang

Historical figures

 Wang Anshi, Song Dynasty politician
 Wang Bao, Han Dynasty poet and author
 Wang Bi, Three Kingdoms Taoist philosopher
 Wang Bo, a Tang dynasty Chinese poet
 Wong Chat Bong, founder of Wong Lo Kat a Chinese herbal tea
 Wang Chong, Chinese philosopher during Han Dynasty
 Wang Chongyang, a Song Dynasty Taoist and founder of Quanzhen School
 Wang Chuzhi, a regional military governor for Dingzhou during the 5 Dynasties and 10 Kingdoms era 
 Wang Cong'er, a female leader of the White Lotus Rebellion
 Wang Dao, Jin Dynasty pre-eminent statesman, premier and advisor
 Wang Dun, Jin Dynasty (266–420), a rebellious Jin general and later warlord
 Empress Wang, an empress of the Chinese dynasty Tang Dynasty.
 Wang Fangqing, real name Wang Lin, served during the Tang Dynasty and Wu Zetian's Zhou Dynasty as a chancellor
 Wang Fu, a philosopher from Gansu in the Eastern Han Dynasty
 Wang Fu, a Shu Han general serving under Liu Bei
 Wang Fu, an influential eunuch in Han Dynasty
 Wang Fu, a painter from Ming Dynasty
 Wang Fuzhi, Chinese philosopher and historian
 Wang Gui Chancellor of the Tang Dynasty
 Wang Guowei, late Qing Dynasty and early Republican Chinese scholar
 Wang Huizu, Chinese jurist. 
 Wang Jian, a greatest general from Qin Dynasty
 Wang Jian, Liu Song and Southern Qi official
 Wang Jian, founding emperor of Former Shu, posthumously known as Gaozu
 Wang Jian, a painter from Ming Dynasty
 Wang Jinghong, Chinese Muslim admiral
 Wang Jishan, served during the Tang Dynasty and Wu Zetian's Zhou Dynasty as a chancellor
 Wang Jun, Jin dynasty general
 Wang Jun, a chancellor during Tang Dynasty
 Wang Lang, a Wei politician during the end of the Han Dynasty and Three Kingdoms
 Wang Mang, founder of the Xin Dynasty
 Wang Meng, known as Marquess Wu of Qinghe is a prime minister for Former Qin
 Wang Nangxian, another female leader of the White Lotus Rebellion
 Wang Rong, known as the 3rd East General, he served during the Jin Dynasty
 Wang Shenzhi, founder of the Min Kingdom in Fujian
 Wang Shichong, a general serving under the Sui Dynasty
 Wang Su, son of Wang Lang, adviser to Sima Shi
 Wang Hui, digital consultant and board member of Haribo
 Wang Wei, Tang Dynasty poet
 Wang Xianzhi, Tang Dynasty agrarian rebel
 Wang Xianzhi, calligrapher
 Wang Xiaojie, a general served during Tang Dynasty and Wu Zetian's Zhou Dynasty
 Wang Xizhi, calligrapher known as the Sage Calligrapher lived in Jin Dynasty
 Wang Xuan, an official of Wu Zetian's Zhou Dynasty, briefly serving as chancellor
 Wang Xuance, a diplomat to India and guard that served during the Tang Dynasty
 Wang Yanhan, son of Wang Shenzhi, second king of the Min Kingdom ruled from 925 to 926
 Wang Yanjun, son of Wang Yanhan, third king of the Min Kingdom ruled from 926 to 935
 Wang Yangming, Ming Dynasty Neo-Confucian
 Wang Yi, official of Cao Wei
 Wang Yuanji, Wife of Sima Zhao and Empress Dowager of Jin Dynasty
 Wang Zhaojun, one of the Four Beauties of ancient China
 Wang Zhen, an official and an inventor for Yuan Dynasty known for the first wooden movable type printing
 Wang Zhen, powerful eunuch during the Ming Dynasty
 Wang Zhen (Wang Yiting), well-known painter of the "Shanghai school" in the Qing Dynasty
 Wang Zhi, a pirate leader in Ming Dynasty
 Wang Zhihuan, a Chinese poet of Tang Dynasty
 Wang Zi-Ping, Chinese Muslim martial artist
 Wang Zongyan, son of Wang Jian, second ruler of the Qian Kingdom (Former Shu)

Mainland China

 Wang Bingbing, Chinese ski mountaineer
 Charles Wang, computer entrepreneur
 Charles Wang (physician), physician and lawyer
 Wang Changyuan, Chinese guzheng performer and composer
 Wang Chiu-chiang, Chinese painter
 Wang Chunchen, Chinese art historian, curator, and critic
 Wang Daiyu, Chinese Muslim scholar
 Wang Dan, student leader – Tiananmen Square dissident
 Wang Daohan, former president of the Association for Relations Across the Taiwan Straits (ARATS)
 Wang Dongxing, Mao Zedong's principal bodyguard during the Cultural Revolution
 Dylan Wang, Chinese actor, singer and model
 Wang Fanxi, Trotskyist
 Wang Feifei, Chinese singer member part of South Korean girl group Miss A.
 Wang Guangmei, wife of Liu Shaoqi, 2nd President of the People's Republic of China
 Wang Guangya, UN ambassador
 Wang Guowei, Chinese historian and poet
 Wang Han, TV show host
 Wang Hao, chess grandmaster
 Wang Hao, table tennis player
 Wang Hao, Chinese-American logician, philosopher and mathematician
 Wang Hongwen, Chinese politician which is the youngest member of the Gang of Four
 Wang Jiexi, Chinese actor
 Wang Jun, a Chinese politician, notorious traitor
 Wang Jun, son of Wang Zhen, is a famous Chinese businessman chairman of CITIC and Poly Technologies, China
 Wang Jun, a PRC politician
 Wang Junkai, singer and actor, member of TFBoys
 Wang Lin, badminton player
 Wang Linkai, Chinese rapper, former member of Chinese boy group Nine Percent
 Wang Ling, historian of Chinese science
 Wang Liqiang, defector
 Wang Liqin, table tennis player
 Wang Ming, a senior leader of the early Chinese Communist Party. Mastermind of 28 Bolsheviks group
 Wang Ming-Chen, Chinese female physicist and science educator 
 Wang Nan, table tennis player
 Wang Qiang, Chinese tennis player
 Wang Qishan, Vice President of the People's Republic of China
 Wang Qing, actor/singer/entrepreneur known for his role at bl drama counterattack web series
 Wang Rong, regional politician in Guangdong and Jiangsu
 Roy Wang, singer and actor, member of TFBoys
 Wang Shiwei, a Chinese journalist and literary writer
 Wang Shizhen, Yuan Shikai's Beiyang subordinate
 Wang Tao, reformer, political essayist, newspaper publisher, fiction writer
 Wang Xiaobo, modern writer
 Wang Xuan, an innovator of the Chinese printing industry
 Wang Yan, Olympic gymnast
 Wang Yanbo, professional wrestler also known as Boa
 Wang Yaowu, high-ranking KMT general who fought the Imperial Japanese army and Chinese Communists from 1924 to 1948
 Wang Yeping, wife of Chinese leader Jiang Zemin, former General Secretary of the Chinese Communist Party
 Wang Yi, State Councilor and Foreign Minister of the People's Republic of China
 Wang Yihan, successful badminton player from Shanghai, China. 2011 World Champion.
 Wang Yibo, Actor and member of Korean-Chinese group Uniq
 Yuja Wang, classical pianist
 Wang Zhaoguo, a Fujian Chinese politician who came to prominence during the era of Deng Xiaoping
 Wang Zhen, a Chinese political figure and one of the Eight Immortals of the Chinese Communist Party
 Wang Zhen, Chinese gymnast
 Wang Zhengjun, Han Dynasty empress
 Wang Zhengwei, politician and former Chairman of Ningxia
 Wang Zhijian, perpetrator of the 2008 Yishun murders who was sentenced to death for murder in 2012.
 Wang Zhizhi, former NBA player
 Wang Zhongshu, archaeologist
 Wang Ziyi, a Chinese actor and rapper, former member of Chinese boy group Nine Percent

Taiwan
 Andrew H. J. Wang, Taiwanese biochemist
 Cyndi Wang, Mandopop singer
 Joanna Wang, Taiwanese-American singer-songwriter
 Leehom Wang, Taiwanese-American singer-songwriter, actor and commercial model
 Ong Iok-tek (Wang Yude), scholar and early leader of the Taiwan independence movement
 Wang Cheng-teng, Deputy Minister of the Council of Agriculture of the Republic of China
 Wang Chien-fa, Magistrate of Penghu County (2005–2014)
 Chien-Ming Wang, former professional baseball pitcher for the New York Yankees and Washington Nationals
 Wang Chien-shien, Republic of China politician
 Wang Chung-yi, Minister of Coast Guard Administration of the Republic of China (2014–2016)
 Darren Wang, Taiwanese actor famous in the Mainland
 Wang Ginn-wang, Minister of the Coast Guard Administration of the Republic of China (2006–2014)
Jimmy Wang Yu (王羽), Mainland-born Taiwanese actor, film director, producer, and screenwriter who started his career in Hong Kong as a Shaw Brothers Studio actor.
 Wang Ju-hsuan, Minister of Council of Labor Affairs of the Republic of China (2008–2012)
 Hsien Chung Wang, Chinese-American mathematician
 Wang Kwo-tsai, Political Deputy Minister of Transportation and Communications
 Wang Li-ling, Chairperson of Financial Supervisory Commission of the Republic of China (2016)
 Wang Mei-hua, former Vice Minister of Economic Affairs of the Republic of China
 Wang Yu-chi, former Minister of Mainland Affairs Council of the Republic of China (2012–2015)
 Wang Yu-yun, former Mayor of Kaohsiung City (1973–1981)

Hong Kong
 Jackson Wang, Hong Kong born Chinese member of South Korean boy group GOT7

Malaysia
 Wang Shujin (Ong Seok Kim), Malaysian educationist, social worker and philanthropist

 Wang Wenhua (Chin Peng)/(Ong Boon Hua)(), Leader of the Malayan Communist Party

Singapore
 Ong Teng Cheong, Former President of the Republic of Singapore
Heng Swee Keat (王瑞杰), Deputy Prime Minister of the Republic of Singapore
 Ong Ye Kung , Singaporean politician
 Daniel Ong , Singaporean businessman, radio DJ and television host
 David Ong , Former Singaporean member of parliament
 Peter Ong , Government official in Singapore
 Thomas Ong , Singaporean actor, television host and businessman
 Xavier Ong , Singaporean actor
 Wang Yuqing , Singaporean actor
 Ong Eng Guan , Singaporean politician
 Ong Keng Sen , Singaporean director of the theatre group TheatreWorks
 Ong Keng Yong , Singaporean diplomat
 Ong Kim Seng, Singaporean artist
 Anthea Ong, former Singaporean Nominated Member of Parliament
 Ong Pang Boon , former Singaporean politician
 Remy Ong , Singaporean bowler
 Ong Soh Khim , former Singaporean Nominated Member of Parliament
 Ong Teck Chin , Singaporean educator
 Melvyn Ong , Singapore army general and the current Chief of Defence Force of the Singapore Armed Forces
 Glenn Ong , Singaporean radio DJ
 Olivia Ong , Singaporean singer and actress
 Wang Sa , Singaporean comedian
 Wang Weiliang , Singaporean actor and singer
 Ong Yeow Tian , Singaporean convicted killer
 Wang Xiuyun , Singaporean actress

Korea
 Wang Bit-na actress and model
 Wang Geon, founder of the royal family of the Goryeo Dynasty
 Wang Jeung-hun, born 1995, professional golfer
 Jun Ji-hyun (born Wang Ji-hyun;) actress and model 
 Wang Ji-won actress and ballet dancer
 Wang Ki-Chun, judo world champion

In non-Asian countries

Australia
Mindy Meng Wang, composer and player of the Guzheng

Canada
 Jeremy Wang (born 1991), better known by his pseudonym Disguised Toast, streamer and Internet personality
 Richard Wang, chess player
 Suning Wang, Chinese-born chemist
 Vincent Wang, competitive video game player

United States
 Angela Wang, figure skater
 Alexander Wang, fashion designer
 An Wang, computer scientist who founded Wang Laboratories
 Chloe Bennet Wong, actress
 Daniel I.C. Wang, Chinese American professor
 Ed Wang, American football player
 Garrett Wang, Chinese American actor
 Ignatius C. Wang, Auxiliary Bishop of San Francisco in 2002-2009
 Iris Wang, badminton player
 Izaac Wang, American actor
 Joanna Wang, Taiwanese-American singer-songwriter
 Wang Ju-Rong, Chinese Muslim martial artist
 Kris Wang, former mayor of Cupertino, California
 Leehom Wang, Taiwanese-American singer-songwriter, actor and commercial model
 Linda Wang, actress
 Lulu Wang, filmmaker 
 Qingde Wang, professor
 Shuping Wang, a Chinese-American medical researcher and public health whistleblower
 Taylor Wang (王赣骏/王贛駿), Chinese-American astronaut
 Vera Wang, fashion designer
 Wayne Wang, film director

Fictional people
 Lo Wang, Shadow Warrior character
 Nina Wáng, My-Otome character
 Wang Jinrei, Tekken character
 Wang Liu Mei, Mobile Suit Gundam 00 character
 Wang Lung, The Good Earth character
 Wang Shizhen, Hikaru no Go character
 Wang Chiang, Moorim School character
 Paul Wang, Space: Above and Beyond character
 Wang Ai Ling, Stitch & Ai character
 Socqueline Wang, Miraculous: Tales of Ladybug & Cat Noir character

See also
 List of common Chinese surnames
 Wang Wang and Funi, two pandas in Adelaide Zoo, South Australia
 Whang, surname
 Vương, Wang in Vietnamese

References

Sources

Chinese-language surnames
Korean-language surnames
Individual Chinese surnames